This is a list of mayors of Fort Frances. The town of Fort Frances, Ontario was incorporated in 1903.

Mayors of Fort Frances
Walter Keating (1903-1905)
Joseph Osborne (1905-1906)
Herb Williams (1907-1910, 1917,1918)
D. C. McKenzie (1911-1913, 1915, 1919)
Louis Christie (1914)
Robert Moore (1916)
Archie McTaggart (1920-1923)
J.P. Wright (1924)
W.H. Elliott (1925-1926)
Walter Woodward (1927-1928)
Fred Morrison (1929-1930, 1934-1935)
B.V. Holmes (1931-1933, 1943-1951)
J.H. Parker (1936-1942)
J.T. Livingstone (1951-1954, 1959-1961)
George Edward Lockhart (1955-1956)
J.M. Newman (1957-1958)
J.R. McVey (1962-1967)
Aimo Marshall (1968-1971)
Allan Avis (1972-1980)
Dean Cunningham (1981-1985)
Dick Lyons (1986-1991)
Glenn Witherspoon (1992-2003)
Dan Onichuk (2003-2006)
Roy Avis (2006-2018)
June Caul (2018-Present)
Andrew Hallikas (2022, elect)

References

Fort Frances